The Blue Line is the newer and shorter line of the MetroLink light rail service in St. Louis, Missouri, United States. It serves 25 stations across three counties and two states in Greater St. Louis.

History
Much of the southern half of the Blue Line follows a former Terminal Railroad Association of St. Louis (TRRA)/Rock Island railroad right of way that ran from BNSF's junction with the Cuba and River subdivisions (known as Southeastern Junction) to what is now Interstate 170 Business Center in St. John, Missouri. The current stretch of line from the Clayton to Forest Park-DeBaliviere stations was known as the Forsyth branch until Rock Island abandoned it in 1931. The TRRA used the trackage from Clayton to St. John until the section from Big Bend to Olive Boulevard was severed to the lack of customers. This was historically known as the TRRA Central Belt. The rest of the track was removed in 2002 prior to construction of the Blue Line. All that remains of the original Central Belt is the portion north from Rock Island Junction, near Overland, Missouri (where the Central Belt crossed the junction between TRRA's West Belt and the Central Midland Railway), to just a fifth of a mile past Page Avenue where some industries still use TRRA trackage.

Arts in Transit 
In 2002, Metro's Arts in Transit program commissioned a group of artists to join architects and engineers during the design phase of the Cross County Expansion. This practice of artist participation during the early stages of system design was established during the design and construction of the initial MetroLink alignment that opened in 1993. The work of these artists involved exploration of landscape alternatives, designing the paving patterns for concrete adjacent to stations, and creating the “flow”-patterned retaining walls running along the tracks in the below-grade stretches of the alignment.

In 2006, the Arts in Transit program commissioned a work made for at-grade stretches of the alignment. An overlay of lacy aluminum silhouettes, titled A Walk in the Park, embellishes the concrete privacy fence, called the Catlin Wall, which runs parallel to the tracks between the Skinker and Forest Park-DeBaliviere stations. Created by Andy Cross, Carl Harris, and Ty de LaVenta, the work is a series of cut metal panels depicting trees, vines, leaves, and trellises.

2022 Flooding 
On July 26, 2022, the Forest Park-DeBaliviere and Delmar Loop stations were flooded in a catastrophic flash flooding event that shut the system down for close to 72 hours. Damage to the stations, rolling stock, ballast, signaling infrastructure, fiber optics, etc. is estimated to be $40 million.

On September 5, 2022, Metro announced new schedules to accommodate repairs being made to the system estimated to take six months or longer. In the immediate aftermath, the Blue Line operated only between the Shrewsbury-Lansdowne I-44 and Forest Park-DeBaliviere stations. In November 2022, Metro announced the restoration of Blue Line service to its Fairview Heights terminal with some speed restrictions in flood damaged sections.

Route

The 24-mile (39 km) Blue Line alignment starts in Shrewsbury, Missouri (Shrewsbury-Lansdowne I-44) just west of the River des Peres. It crosses over Interstate 44 and continues north to the next two stations located in Maplewood, Missouri (Sunnen and Maplewood/Manchester). The line then continues north to the Brentwood I-64 station, located in Brentwood, Missouri just south of Interstate 64. It then proceeds north in a tunnel underneath Interstate 64, continuing to the Richmond Heights station serving the popular Saint Louis Galleria shopping mall. The line then proceeds through a sharp turn east to the Clayton station in the median of Forest Park Parkway in Clayton, Missouri where it serves the Central Business District of St. Louis County. It heads further east to the Forsyth station where it then enters a tunnel traveling to the University City-Big Bend subway station. After crossing the St. Louis City/County boundary, the Blue Line makes its last stop at the Skinker subway station serving nearby Washington University.  At the following station, Forest Park-DeBaliviere, the Blue Line meets the Red Line. From this station the two services share a track alignment with each other until the Blue Line terminates at the Fairview Heights station in Illinois.

Shared Alignment 
From the Forest Park-DeBaliviere station, the Blue and Red lines share the same set of tracks for the next 16 stations. Continuing east, the Central West End and Cortex stations serve the popular Central West End neighborhood, Washington University Medical Center and Cortex Innovation Community. The Grand station transfers with the busy #70 MetroBus line and serves Saint Louis University and its hospital. Next, the Union Station, Civic Center, Stadium, 8th & Pine, Convention Center and Laclede's Landing stations serve downtown St. Louis and its many popular attractions. Crossing the historic Eads Bridge into Illinois, the line serves the East Riverfront, 5th & Missouri, Emerson Park, Jackie Joyner-Kersee Center, and Washington Park stations in East St. Louis, Illinois. At the next station, Fairview Heights, the Blue Line terminates and the shared alignment ends.

Stations 
From Shrewsbury−Lansdowne I-44 to Fairview Heights (west to east)

Previous extension proposals 
These extensions were proposed when Metro released its Moving Transit Forward plan in 2010. Most are now defunct as regional leadership has said their current focus is on the City and North County corridors and not previous expansion proposals.

Cross County Corridors 
Daniel Boone - Clayton to Maryland Heights/Westport & Chesterfield

 A study performed in 2000 recommended a new MetroLink line from Clayton, Missouri to Westport Plaza in Maryland Heights, Missouri. The 8 to 10-mile (13-16 km) line would have run north from the Clayton station along the disused Terminal Railroad Association of St. Louis "Central Belt" right-of-way paralleling Interstate 170, then turn west to follow existing Union Pacific Railroad trackage operated by Central Midland Railway to Page Avenue where the line would have then followed Page to Westport Plaza. This proposed alignment would have added up to six stations between Clayton and Maryland Heights in the Interstate 170 and Page corridors serving Ladue, Olivette, and Overland.

 A  extension to Chesterfield would have been a potential Phase II of the Daniel Boone Corridor. The alignment would have headed west from Westport Plaza and crossed over Interstate 270 in Maryland Heights. It would have then run along the Page Avenue Extension (Highway 364) until it turned towards Creve Coeur Lake Memorial Park. It then would have headed westward to Spirit of St. Louis Airport in the Chesterfield Valley. This alignment has not been given serious consideration because of its perceived low ridership potential.

MetroNorth - Clayton to Florissant

 This  extension would have extended the current Blue Line from Clayton towards North County and into Florissant, Missouri. Like the Daniel Boone line, some of it will follow along the old Terminal Railroad Association of St. Louis "Central Belt" right-of-way paralleling I-170.

MetroSouth - Shrewsbury to Butler Hill

 This  extension would have extended the current Blue Line from its terminus in Shrewsbury, Missouri further into South County beyond Interstates 270/255 to Butler Hill Road. An environmental impact study was completed in 2004; however, selection of an LPA was deferred due to the lack of local funding sources as well as other factors.

See also 
 List of St. Louis MetroLink stations
 Red Line (St. Louis MetroLink)

References 

 
Metro Transit (St. Louis)
MetroLink (St. Louis)
Light rail in Missouri
Light rail in Illinois
Proposed railway lines in Missouri